Bharti Dhirubhai Shiyal  is an Indian politician. She was elected to the Lok Sabha, the lower house of the Parliament of India from Bhavnagar, Gujarat as a member of the Bharatiya Janata Party. She was earlier elected to the Gujarat Legislative Assembly in 2012 from Talaja in Bhavnagar district . She is consulting Ayurvedic practitioner by profession. She belong to Koli community of Gujarat. She is a National Vice President of the BJP.

See also 
 Shial
 List of Koli people

References

External links
 Official biographical sketch in Parliament of India website

Living people
Gujarat MLAs 2012–2017
People from Bhavnagar district
Women in Gujarat politics
Articles created or expanded during Women's History Month (India) - 2014
India MPs 2014–2019
Lok Sabha members from Gujarat
21st-century Indian women politicians
21st-century Indian politicians
Bharatiya Janata Party politicians from Gujarat
1964 births
India MPs 2019–present